Connecticut's 68th House of Representatives district elects one member of the Connecticut House of Representatives. It consists of the town of Watertown and parts of Woodbury. It has been represented by Republican Joseph Poletta since 2017.

Recent elections

2020

2018

2017 special

2016

2014

2012

References

68